İsmet Akpınar (born May 22, 1995) is a Turkish-German professional basketball player for Fenerbahçe of the Turkish Basketball Super League (BSL) and the EuroLeague.

Early years
Akpınar started his career in the BC Hamburg youth ranks. At the age of 16, he made his professional debut with SC Rist Wedel in the ProB, the third tier of German basketball, earning Eurobasket.com All-German ProB Rookie of the Year honors following the 2011–12 season. At the same time, he excelled at the youth level playing for Piraten Hamburg and was named JBBL (under-16 Bundesliga) Player of the Year in 2011 as well as NBBL (under-19 Bundesliga) Rookie of the Year the following season.

Professional career
In February 2013, Akpınar agreed on a four-year deal with Bundesliga side Alba Berlin. In the 2016-17 season, he received the BBL Best German Young Player Award.

On June 7, 2017, he signed with ratiopharm Ulm. In the 2017–18 season, he was invited for the BBL All-Star Game for the first time in his career. In 2019, Akpinar played in his second All-Star Game and was MVP of the match. 

On July 30, 2019, he has signed contract with Beşiktaş Sompo Japan of the Basketbol Süper Ligi.

On May 25, 2020, he has signed with Bayern Munich of the Basketball Bundesliga (BBL).

On July 11, 2020, he has signed with Bahçeşehir Koleji of the Turkish Basketball Super League (BSL).

On June 18, 2021, he signed a two-year contract with Fenerbahçe Beko of the Turkish Basketball Super League (BSL) and the EuroLeague.

National team

Akpınar has represented the German Junior National Teams on many occasions. In August 2010, he played in the North Sea Development Basketball Cup, guiding the German under-15 squad to a second-place finish.

He was with the Germany U16 National Team, competing in the 2011 under-16 European Championships, and was selected to play for Germany's U18 team at the 2012 Albert-Schweitzer-Tournament as well as at the 2012 and 2013 under-18 European Championships. In 2014 and 2015, he played for his country in the under-20 European Championships. In the summer of 2017, he was capped for the first time for Germany's men's national team.

Personal life
He is younger brother of the Turkish player Mutlu Akpınar.

References

External links
EuroCup Profile
German BBL Profile
Eurobasket.com Profile

1995 births
Living people
2019 FIBA Basketball World Cup players
Alba Berlin players
Bahçeşehir Koleji S.K. players
Beşiktaş men's basketball players
Fenerbahçe men's basketball players
German men's basketball players
German people of Turkish descent
Point guards
Ratiopharm Ulm players
Shooting guards
Sportspeople from Hamburg